Unseen Enemy is a 1942 American spy thriller film directed by John Rawlins and starring Don Terry as a Canadian military intelligence agent trying to uncover a plot to sabotage American ships. Leo Carrillo plays the unscrupulous waterfront club owner who sells usage of his club as a rendezvous point for German, Italian and Japanese spies.

Cast
Irene Hervey as Gin Rand, Nick's stepdaughter
Don Terry as Capt. William Flynn Hancock, Canadian spy with multiple aliases 
Leo Carrillo as Nick Rand, owner of The Schooner Club
Andy Devine as Sam Dillon
Lionel Royce as Capt. Willhelm Roering
Turhan Bey as Ito
Clancy Cooper as Police inspector Alan Davies
Hugh Beaumont as Narrator

References

External links
 
 
 
 

1942 films
1940s thriller drama films
American black-and-white films
American thriller drama films
1942 drama films
Films directed by John Rawlins
1940s English-language films
1940s American films